Mburucuyá National Park is a national park in Argentina.

The area is important for the provision of water, the regulation of floods and droughts in the local region through its effects on the regional microclimate.

History
Around 5,000 years ago the area was populated by indigenous peoples, in more recent times the area was occupied by the Guaraní who introduced the cultivation of maize, squash, beans, Cassava, cotton and yerba mate.

When the territory was colonized by the Spanish many of the original settlements were occupied and substantially modified. The introduction of large scale agriculture saw the indiscriminate deforestation of native trees.

The creation of the national park occurred in the 20th century. After the Second World War Dr. Troels Pederson donated the territory for the creation of the national park. The objectives of the park are to maintain the environment and show the region in its historical context.

Plant communities
The park is divided between three distinct plant communities – chaqueña, espinal, and selva paranaense.

Chaco Oriental
The Chaco Oriental or Humid Chaco is composed of woodland, palms, grass plains and wetlands. Some characteristic native species are quebracho colorado (Schinopsis lorentzii) and quebraco blanco (Aspidosperma quebracho-blanco), urunday (Myracrodruon balansae), and viraró (Ruprechtia laxiflora), Prosopis, and caranday palm (Copernicia alba).

Selva Paranaense
The Selva Paranaense is characterised by small hills, local species include the palms Syagrus romanzoffiana and timbó (Enterolobium contortisiliquum), and laurel.

El Espinal
The Espinal is populated with yatay palms, grassland, and diverse xerophile woodland.

Fauna
The park has around 150 species of birds, and many species of animal including capybara, caymen, foxes armadillos jaguars and brown howler monkeys. Endangered species include maned wolf neotropical river otter and marsh deer.

Native fish species include golden dorado and pseudoplatystoma.

References 

National parks of Argentina
Protected areas of Corrientes Province
Humid Chaco